General Sir Augustus Francis Andrew Nicol Thorne,  (20 September 1885 – 25 September 1970) was a senior British Army officer who served in the First and Second World Wars, where he commanded the 48th (South Midland) Infantry Division during the Battle of France in mid-1940.

Family
Thorne was the son of Augustus Thorne, a barrister, and Mary Frances Nicol. His nephew, Patrick Campbell-Preston, was the husband of Dame Frances Campbell-Preston.

On 29 July 1909 he married the Hon. Margaret Douglas-Pennant, daughter of George Douglas-Pennant, 2nd Baron Penrhyn, at the Guards' Chapel, Wellington Barracks, in London. They had six children, including Lt. Col. Sir Peter Francis Thorne.

Military career
Educated at Eton and the Royal Military College, Sandhurst, Thorne was commissioned as a second lieutenant into the Grenadier Guards on 2 March 1904.

He served in the First World War, becoming a staff captain, then deputy assistant adjutant and quartermaster general and then deputy assistant quartermaster general in France. He became Commanding Officer (CO) of the 3rd Battalion, Grenadier Guards in 1916, and saw action in the First Battle of Ypres in 1914 and Battle of the Somme in 1916, earning the Distinguished Service Order and two Bars. In 1918 he became commander of the 184th Brigade.

After the war he became assistant military attaché at Washington, D.C.. He then returned to the United Kingdom to attend a shortened course at the Staff College, Camberley. This was followed, in 1922, by him becoming a General staff Officer (GSO) at London District. He served at the Staff College as an instructor from 1923 to 1925. He was appointed military assistant to the Chief of the Imperial General Staff (CIGS) at the War Office in 1925 CO of the 3rd Battalion, Grenadier Guards again in 1927. In 1932, he was made military attaché in Berlin for three years, where he came to know Adolf Hitler and many of his senior officers personally. He was commander of the 1st Guards Brigade at Aldershot Command in 1935, a temporary brigade commander in Palestine and Transjordan in 1936, and in 1938 he became Major General commanding the Brigade of Guards and General Officer Commanding (GOC) London District.

In 1939, at the start of the Second World War, Thorne became GOC 48th (South Midland) Infantry Division, which played an important role in the defence of the Dunkirk perimeter in 1940. He then became GOC XII Corps before being appointed GOC Scottish Command and Governor of Edinburgh Castle from 1941 to 1945. As GOC XII Corps, he founded the innovative XII Corps Observation Unit as a prototype of the Auxiliary Units guerrilla organisation. Whilst in Scotland, he was involved in the creation of War Office Selection Boards and responsible for the Fortitude North deception plan, as well as preparation for the liberation of Norway.

Germany officially surrendered in Norway on 8 May 1945, and Thorne arrived in Norway on 13 May together with Crown Prince Olav. He brought with him a small military force—one tenth the size of the German military presence—and so had to rely on cooperation with paramilitary forces from the Norwegian resistance movement. He cooperated closely with Jens Chr. Hauge. He formally held the sovereignty of Norway until 7 June, when Haakon VII of Norway returned from his exile. Thorne remained in charge of dismantling the German presence in Norway until he left the country on 31 October 1945.

He retired in 1946. He was chairman of the Anglo-Norse Society for some time and was at some point a deputy lieutenant of Berkshire.

References

Bibliography

"THORNE, General Sir (Augustus Francis) Andrew (Nicol)". (2007). In Who Was Who. Online edition.

External links
British Army Officers 1939–1945
Find a Grave
Generals of World War II

 

|-

|-

|-
 

1885 births
1970 deaths
British military attachés
Graduates of the Staff College, Camberley
Burials in Berkshire
British Army generals
British Army generals of World War I
British Army generals of World War II
British military personnel of the 1936–1939 Arab revolt in Palestine
Commanders of the Legion of Merit
Commanders with Star of the Order of Polonia Restituta
Companions of the Distinguished Service Order
Companions of the Order of St Michael and St George
Deputy Lieutenants of Berkshire
Graduates of the Royal Military College, Sandhurst
Grenadier Guards officers
Knights Commander of the Order of the Bath
People educated at Eton College
People from Sevenoaks
Academics of the Staff College, Camberley
Military personnel from Kent